Liechtenstein made its Paralympic Games début at the 1984 Summer Paralympics in Stoke Mandeville and New York City, entering just one athlete (Iris Schaedler) in athletics. The country competed again at the 1988 and 1992 Summer Games, and at the 1992 and 1994 Winter Games. It was then absent from the Paralympics until the 2004 Summer Games in Athens, where it sent just one table tennis player, Peter Frommelt. Liechtenstein was absent from the 2006 and 2010 Winter Games and the 2008 Summer Games.

Liechtenstein has won a single Paralympic medal: a bronze in alpine skiing in 1994.

Liechtenstein is the second smallest sovereign country, and the third smallest National Paralympic Committee (after Macau), ever to have competed at the Paralympic Games - as Tuvalu, Nauru, Monaco and the Vatican City have yet to do so.

As in the  Olympics, Liechtenstein is the only participating country to have won a medal only at the Winter Paralympic Games but not in the summer event.

Medallists

See also
 Liechtenstein at the Olympics

References